This article displays the women singles qualifying draw of the 2011 China Open (tennis).

Players

Seeds

Qualifiers

Qualifying draw

First qualifier

Second qualifier

Third qualifier

Fourth qualifier

Fifth qualifier

Sixth qualifier

Seventh qualifier

Eighth qualifier

References
 Qualifying Draw

China Open - Qualifying
2011 qualifying
2011 China Open (tennis)
Qualification for tennis tournaments